Parkside Whispering Pines, once known as Tall Maples Miniature Golf Course, is a miniature golf course and national historic district located at the hamlet of Sea Breeze in the Town of Irondequoit in Monroe County, New York. It was built in 1930 and is a rare surviving example of a miniature golf course that dates from the sport's first period of broad based popularity.

It was listed, under its former name, on the National Register of Historic Places in 2002.

References

External links
Official website

Historic districts on the National Register of Historic Places in New York (state)
Buildings and structures completed in 1930
Miniature golf
Buildings and structures in Monroe County, New York
Tourist attractions in Monroe County, New York
National Register of Historic Places in Monroe County, New York